The 2022 Massachusetts Attorney General election took place on November 8, 2022, to elect the next attorney general of Massachusetts. Incumbent Democratic Attorney General Maura Healey was eligible to seek a third term, but instead announced she would run for governor.

Democratic primary

Candidates

Nominee
Andrea Campbell, former president of the Boston City Council and candidate for mayor of Boston in 2021

Eliminated in primary 
Shannon Liss-Riordan, labor attorney and candidate for U.S. Senate in 2020

Withdrew
Quentin Palfrey, former deputy general counsel at the U.S. Department of Commerce and nominee for lieutenant governor in 2018 (endorsed Campbell; remained on ballot)

Declined
Maura Healey, Massachusetts attorney general (2015–2023) (running for governor)
Jon Mitchell, mayor of New Bedford
Marian Ryan, Middlesex County district attorney (running for reelection)

Endorsements

Debate
A debate was held on August 10, hosted by WBUR-FM.

Polling

Results

Convention

Primary

Republican primary

Candidates

Nominee
Jay McMahon, Bourne attorney and nominee for attorney general in 2018

Declined
Andrew Lelling, former U.S. Attorney for the District of Massachusetts

Results

General election

Predictions

Polling

Results

Notes

Partisan clients

References

External links
Andrea Campbell (D) for Attorney General
Jay McMahon (R) for Attorney General
Shannon Liss-Riordan (D) for Attorney General
Quentin Palfrey (D) for Attorney General

Attorney General
Massachusetts
Massachusetts Attorney General elections